The 2021 FIVB Women's Club World Championship was the 14th edition of the tournament. For the first time it was held in Ankara, Turkey from 15 to 19 December. Six teams competed in the tournament, including two wild cards.

Qualification

Pools composition

Squads

Venue

Pool standing procedure

Ranking system:
 Number of victories
 Match points
 Set ratio
 Point ratio
 Result of the last match between the tied teams

Preliminary round
All times are Turkish Time (UTC+03:00).

Pool A

|}

|}

Pool B

|}

|}

Final round
All times are Turkish Time (UTC+03:00).

Semifinals

|}

3rd place match

|}

Final

|}

Final standing

Awards

Most Valuable Player
 Isabelle Haak (VakıfBank İstanbul)
Best Opposite
 Isabelle Haak (VakıfBank İstanbul)
Best Outside Spikers
 Gabriela Guimarães (VakıfBank İstanbul)
 Arina Fedorovtseva (Fenerbahçe Opet İstanbul)

Best Middle Blockers
 Zehra Güneş (VakıfBank İstanbul)
 Robin de Kruijf (Imoco Volley Conegliano)
Best Setter
 Joanna Wołosz (Imoco Volley Conegliano)
Best Libero
 Monica De Gennaro (Imoco Volley Conegliano)

See also
 2021 FIVB Volleyball Men's Club World Championship

References

External links
Official website

FIVB Volleyball Women's Club World Championship
FIVB Women's Club World Championship
International volleyball competitions hosted by Turkey
FIVB
2021